Russula subnigricans, known as nisekurohatsu (Japanese), is a basidiomycete mushroom of the genus Russula found in China, Japan, and Taiwan.

Description
The flesh turns pale red when cut, but doesn't turn black unlike Russula nigricans.

The species was named by Japanese mycologist Tsuguo Hongo in 1955.

The name was formerly applied to the North American fungus Russula eccentrica in California. It has been reclassified as Russula cantharellicola, where it grows in association with coast live oak (Quercus agrifolia) trees in California oak woodland habitats.

Toxicity
Russula subnigricans is a poisonous mushroom, and has been responsible for mushroom poisoning in Taiwan and Japan. The effect is a serious one, rhabdomyolysis.

The toxins responsible are the very unusual cycloprop-2-ene carboxylic acid (a toxic molecule consisting of only four carbon atoms) and Russuphelin A (a heavily chlorinated polyphenolic).

See also
 List of deadly fungi
 List of Russula species

References

External links
Cornell University Mycology Blog:  "A deadly Russula"

subnigricans
Fungi of China
Fungi of Japan
Fungi of North America
Deadly fungi
Fungi described in 1955